Hard Boiled Sweets is a 2012 British crime drama film written and directed by David L.G. Hughes. It tells the story of a group of squabbling Essex gangsters. The cast includes two actors (Paul Freeman and Ian Hart) that had appeared in Hughes' earlier short film A Girl and a Gun from which this, his first feature, was developed.

Plot
London crime boss Jimmy the Gent travels to Southend in Essex to collect some monies owed to him by local gangster Shrewd Eddie. There, various assorted gangsters, corrupt police and petty criminals attempt to steal from Jimmy a case containing £1 million in cash.

Main cast

Critical reception
The film was largely negatively received by reviewers. The Guardians Henry Barnes described it as a glossy hybrid of American noir and British gangster films "with nothing under the wrapper". Tom Seymour of Empire summed it up as "A miserable mess of gangland cliches and narrative tangle". Tom Huddleston of Time Out also found it clichéd – "more Cockernee crime by numbers" – but also suggested that it had "a fistful of decent throwaway gags and enough plot surprises to just about carry it through the rough patches". ScreenDaily praised its technical aspects including Anders Bundgaard's opening credit sequence and Sara Deane's cinematography, describing it overall as "an intriguing debut".

Box office
The film received a limited release and according to Box Office Mojo took only $6,462 in two weeks in cinemas. It was released on DVD and Blu-ray Disc on 30 April 2012.

References

External links
 
 
 

2012 films
British crime drama films
2012 crime drama films
2010s English-language films
2010s British films